The Funiu Mountains, also known by their Chinese name Funiu Shan, are a mountain range in southern Shanxi and western Henan provinces in China.

Geography
The Funiu are an eastern extension of the Qins, running south of the Yellow River after its southern return from the Ordos Loop. The hills to its east bear the headwaters to tributaries to the Huai.

History
During the Chinese Civil War, the eastern foothills of the Funius were the site of a 1947 Communist victory over the Nationalist army.

Sites
 Funiu Shan World Geology Park

Culture
The geographer Zheng Ruoceng considered the kung fu of the Buddhist monks of the Funius second in China after that practiced by the monks of Shaolin. They specialized in staves.

The mountains are also the namesake of the Funiu White, a Chinese goat breed.

Notes

References

Citations

Bibliography
 .

External links

Mountains of Shanxi
Mountains of Henan